Dekšāres Parish is an administrative territorial entity of Rēzekne Municipality in the Latgale region of Latvia.

Towns, villages and settlements of Dekšāres parish 

Parishes of Latvia
Rēzekne Municipality
Latgale